Jean-Pierre Dutilleux (born 13 October 1949) is a Belgian author, activist, film director, actor and editor of films.

Career

During his 40-year career, Jean-Pierre Dutilleux has made thirty films, including a dozen in Amazonia, taken thousands of photographs and published six books.

Jean-Pierre Dutilleux rose to international prominence with his academy Award-nominated documentary, Raoni, an investigation of the complex issues surrounding the survival of the remaining indigenous natives of the Amazon Rainforest and indeed, of the Rainforest itself.

A native of Belgium, Dutilleux earned a Bachelor of Arts degree in French and Literature from Saint Hadelin College in Liege, and later studied law, languages and economics at the University of Louvain. During his college years, Dutilleux traveled throughout North and South America, awakening passion and developing respect for the native tribes. In 1972, he served as assistant to Costa-Gavras on the production "State of Siege" in Chile. Two years later, at the age of 23, Dutilleux completed his first film, a study of natives of the Amazon.

In the years since, he has filmed and photographed over 50 tribes worldwide, produced a dozen films in the Amazon, sailed around the world, and documented countless unique adventures. Additionally, his work as a photojournalist has appeared in 100-plus magazines in dozens of countries.

On one of his visits to the Amazon, Dutilleux was joined by noted rock musician Sting, who was able to experience firsthand the indigenous tribes of the fast disappearing jungle. Together they authored articles exposing the fate of the native Amazonians which, fortified by Dutilleux's powerful photos, propelled the rainforest issues into the global spotlight. Encouraged by response to the stories, the pair created The Rainforest Foundation to support the Indians' fight for survival, launching an international campaign with a television spot starring Sting and produced and directed by Dutilleux. Accompanied by Chief Raoni, they embarked on a world tour and, in only 60 days, established local foundations in 12 countries, raising awareness and funds to protect the rainforest. In six recently published books, Dutilleux recounts these adventures and shares his remarkable photographs. The publicity and campaigning has to date secured the future of more than 25 million hectares of rainforest, not only in South America.

Controversies
Controversies regularly mark the career of Jean-Pierre Dutilleux since the release of his documentary film Raoni (1978).

As early as July 22, 1981, the Brazilian daily Folha de S. Paulo stated that the FUNAI (National Indian Foundation, Indian affairs agency in Brazil) is behind the creation of a precedent-setting law, as a result of the problems encountered with the movie Raoni. The article, which explains that Raoni was the first commercial film in Brazil with the participation of Indians, claims that he "did not respect the agreement signed with FUNAI to transfer 10% of the profits to the Indians Txucarramae, of the Xingu River region." The article details the new criteria put in place by the FUNAI: "the Indians who will take part in the shootings will have to be paid and notified to the Union of the Artists of Rio de Janeiro and the FUNAI." According to Dutilleux, the allegations in this article are contradicted by a letter dated May 7, 1990 from Raoni's nephew Megaron Txuccaramae, who makes it clear that the Indians have received royalties from the Raoni film: "With this letter, we want to thank Jean-Pierre Dutilleux for his support to the Indians over the years. Since 1973, when we knew him, he is a great friend of the Indians. When he did the movie Raoni, in 1976, he was the first filmmaker to give the Indians royalties that we received directly from the Embrafilm distributor after he opened our first bank account." This letter, which was read to Raoni and approved by him in the presence of the counselor of the Belgian Embassy in Brasilia, was published in the book L'Indien blanc.

In January 1990, a few months after having traveled the world with chief Raoni and Sting, Jean-Pierre Dutilleux was profiled in an investigation by the French edition of Rolling Stone magazine. The author, Mark Zeller, said that Dutilleux, close to bankruptcy before his meeting with Sting, enriched himself during their charitable actions. According to Dutilleux, Mark Zeller's allegations are contradicted by Megaron Txuccaramae's letter of May 7, 1990, in which he indicates that Jean-Pierre Dutilleux was not paid for his charitable actions.

On April 2, 1990, Britain's ITV Network broadcast an episode of the investigative TV programme World in Action, "Sting and the Indians", in which Jean-Pierre Dutilleux was denounced by Sting about the book Jungle Stories (published by JC Lattès), which they wrote and promoted together during their charity tour. Sting said he has lobbied Dutilleux without success to return his generous advance on royalty rights to the Rainforest Foundation, created to help Brazilian indigenous peoples protect the Amazon rainforest. World in Action explained that Dutilleux kept the money and left the Rainforest Foundation after the episode. A note from the administrators of the Rainforest Foundation of April 2, 1990, made public by the Association forêt Vierge in March 2017, states that if he has never received a cent from the Rainforest Foundation, "Jean-Pierre Dutilleux has received a lump sum for the repurchase of his photographs for the book Jungle Stories, in compensation of the costs of 16 years of travel, lodging, photographic expenses, repayments with rights holders, etc. He indicated his intention that all other royalties be returned to the Rainforest Foundation." In the same investigation, Dutilleux is accused by photographer Alexis de Vilar, co-founder with him of the charity Tribal Life Fund, of being at the origin of the disappearance of the receipts of a gala organized at the Chinese Theatre in Hollywood on March 28, 1979 to support the Raoni movie. 

On September 21, 1991, Belgian newspaper Le Soir released an article entitled "The Director of FUNAI denounces the Raoni-Dutilleux campaign", while Dutilleux had just launched a major fund-raising campaign from Belgium which he claimed with the consent of FUNAI. Sydney Possuelo, President-in-Office of FUNAI, declared: "Mr. Dutilleux is not and has never been authorized to raise funds on behalf of FUNAI, the Coordination of the Isolated Indians, or myself." On October 7, 1991, Brazilian daily newspaper Folha de S. Paulo took over the affair in its title "A Belgian exploits Indians in the Amazon and tries a $ 5 million scam", saying that "the president of Funai, Sydney Possuelo, ended the scam, which promised individual donors and companies "rescue diplomas" of the Amazon." The article exposed that Jean-Pierre Dutilleux mentioned the embassy of Belgium as support for his fundraising campaign and concluded on this point: "the Embassy asserts that its name was misquoted."

On October 9, 2000, Época (Brazilian magazine) dedicated an article to Jean-Pierre Dutilleux, whom she nicknamed "the Belgian sorcerer". The subtitle set the tone: "Who is Jean-Pierre Dutilleux, filmmaker who in three decades has earned fame and money by exploiting the image of Raoni and other Indians of Brazil". For example, it is claimed that Dutilleux illegally sold photos of indigenous on the internet. Less than three weeks later, the daily Gazeta do povo claimed that Jean-Pierre Dutilleux was banned by FUNAI from entering a reserve and specified that an investigation was opened against him "for sale of photos without payment of author rights". The mentioned judicial procedure also emanated from a request for investigation from chief Raoni on the "fundraising carried out by Mr. Jean-Pierre Dutilleux outside Brazil, through abuse of the use of the name and the image of chief Raoni", especially with the French government.

In 2012, it was said in the Brazilian documentary film Belo Monte Announcement of a War (Belo Monte, Anúncio de uma Guerra), directed by André d'Elia, that the Association Forêt Vierge of Jean-Pierre Dutilleux held "hostage" chief Raoni and his two companions indigenous peoples, while they had come to campaign in Europe in September 2011 against the Belo Monte dam, to the construction of which French companies are associated. In a sequence, Raoni confirms that Jean-Pierre Dutilleux "did not allow anyone to approach me" and shows a petition against Belo Monte which Dutilleux and his team, he says, have tried to prevent the shed. It is also alleged that the same team would have tried to exchange the silence of Chief Raoni on the misdeeds of the Belo Monte project against a promise that the borders of a territory of his people are traced.

On August 12, 2016, kayapo leaders Raoni Metuktire and Megaron Txucarramae announced through a press release published on the official website and Facebook page of the Instituto Raoni that they definitively cut any relationship with Jean-Pierre Dutilleux after several failures: "We recognize what Jean-Pierre Dutilleux has sometimes been able to bring to the level of the disclosure of our fight, but we have never appreciated his lack of respect, his opportunism and the way he exploited our image and the name of Cacique Raoni, to the point of damaging his reputation and jeopardizing his credibility". Jean-Pierre Dutilleux responded to these accusations via a video posted on YouTube and on the website of the Association Forêt Vierge.

On August 7, 2018, French NGO Planète Amazone accused Jean-Pierre Dutilleux in a statement of having deliberately acted, "in Brazil and France", to destroy the confidence of his partners, saying that he "did not hesitate to use the name of an incumbent head of state in an attempt to obtain statements of denunciation from indigenous leaders against Planète Amazone, claiming that it was this head of state himself who demanded, prior to offer his support." Online correspondence refers to Albert II, Prince of Monaco as the mentioned head of state.

In one of his films dedicated to the Toulambi tribe of Papua New Guinea, Dutilleux believes his film footage includes this tribe's first encounter with modern white men, and poses the possibility this may be the last time in history this can occur. A video of this film has been extensively posted in the internet, prompting much discussion and questions about this claim. According to an article in the peer-reviewed Journal of Pacific History, the colonial archives indicate that the territory of the Toulambis had been visited by at least six patrols between 1929 and 1972 which seems to debunk this claim.

Dutilleux has worked intensively with thirty jungle tribes some of whom have only minimal contact with the outside world. He is working on a big-screen movie drama about an Amazonian tribe, which may include combining aspects of several tribes he knows, to tell a typical history of Amazonian tribes.

Filmography 
 Raoni 1 award
The Toulambi. First Contact in New Guinea (1998)

Books 
Books published by Dutilleux:
 Raoni, My Last Journey (2019)
 On the Trail of Lost Peoples (2015)
 Tribes: First World peoples (2013)
 Raoni: Memoirs of an Indian Chief (2010)
 Raoni and the First World (2000)
 The White Indian : 20 years of Amazonian Spell (1994)
 Raoni, an Indian Around the World in 60 days (1990)
 Jungle Stories, with Sting (1989)

References

External links 
 

1949 births
Living people
Belgian film directors
Belgian male film actors